The 2017 Superliga Colombiana (known as the 2017 Superliga Águila for sponsorship purposes) was the sixth edition of the Superliga Colombiana. It was contested by the champions of the 2016 Categoría Primera A season from 21 January to 29 January 2017. Santa Fe were the winners, beating Independiente Medellín 1–0 on aggregate score.

Teams

Matches

First leg

Second leg

External links
Dimayor

References

Superliga Colombiana
Superliga Colombiana 2017
Superliga Colombiana 2017
Superliga Colombiana
Superliga Colombiana